Lobophytum irregulare is a species of soft coral in the family Alcyoniidae.

References 

Alcyoniidae
Animals described in 1970